The Harmonium in My Memory is a 1999 South Korean film based on the best-selling Korean semi-autobiographical novel Female Student by Ha Keum-chan.

Plot 
In 1962, South Korea. Kang Soo-ha, a 21-year-old teacher from Seoul, takes his first job at a village school in Gangwon Province. One of his older students, 17-year-old Yun Hong-yeon, develops a crush on him, though her efforts to catch his attention seem to go unnoticed. Meanwhile, Soo-ha has fallen for Yang Eun-hee, a fellow teacher at their school.

Cast 
 Lee Byung-hun as Kang Soo-ha
 Jeon Do-yeon as Yun Hong-yeon
 Lee Mi-yeon as Yang Eun-hee
 Jeon Moo-song
 Choi Joo-bong
 Lee In-cheol
 Song Ok-sook
 Kim Seon-hwa
 Lee Dae-yeon
 Shin Shin-ae as Sangju-daek

Release 
The Harmonium in My Memory was released in South Korea on March 27, 1999.

Awards 
Jeon Do-yeon won Best Actress at the 1999 Blue Dragon Film Awards, 1999 Director's Cut Awards, and 2000 Grand Bell Awards for her performance.

The film won Best Picture at the 2000 Verona Love Screens Film Festival.

Musical theatre 
The film was adapted into a musical Organ in My Memory (also known as Organ in My Heart) in 2008, which focused on reviving the romantic atmosphere and literary sensitivity of the 1960s on stage as the film did. "The original novel was published in 1980s and the film was made in 1990s and now the musical rendition will be made in 2000s, showing the tireless energy of the work because of its pure and touching story," a public relations official of the production company Show Tic Communications, said. The musical featured visually catching pink-toned stage sets to exude a romantic atmosphere, along with modern music and choreography played by 21 actors to curry favor with the modern audience. The initial run at Hoam Arts Hall (July 22 to September 11, 2008) also drew attention from the public for the return of musical theater-turned-TV/film actor Oh Man-seok to the stage.

At the 2008 Korea Musical Awards, it swept Best Original Korean Musical, Best Direction (Cho Gwang-hwa), Best Composition, Best Scenario, Best Stage Design and Best New Actor (Jo Jung-suk - Oh's alternate for the lead role).

The musical had a second run on July 16 to August 28, 2011 at Hoam Arts Hall in Sunhwa-dong, central Seoul. Oh Man-seok, the star of the first run, returned this time as the director. Oh cast singer Tim and musical actor Kim Seung-dae to take over the lead role.

References

External links 
 
 
 

1999 films
South Korean romantic drama films
South Korean coming-of-age drama films
Films about educators
Films set in Gangwon Province, South Korea
1990s Korean-language films
1990s teen romance films
Films set in the 1960s
1999 romantic drama films
1990s coming-of-age drama films